Bikam is a small estate town in Hilir Perak District, Perak, Malaysia. It is situated beside the main road (Federal Road 58) connecting Teluk Intan and Bidor. Kuala Bikam is famous for its fruits as there are many fruit farms around the town.

Hilir Perak District
Towns in Perak